Jurgita is a Lithuanian feminine given name. It is derived from the masculine given name Jurgis. People bearing the name Jurgita include:
Jurgita Dronina (born 1986), Russian-Lithuanian ballet dancer
Jurgita Jurkutė (born 1985), actress and former Miss Lithuania beauty contest winner
Jurgita Štreimikytė (born 1972), basketball player

References

Feminine given names
Lithuanian feminine given names